Iván Castillo may refer to:
 Iván Castillo (footballer) (born 1970), Bolivian football player
 Iván Castillo (baseball) (born 1995), Dominican professional baseball infielder